Aleksa Avramović (born October 25, 1994) is a Serbian professional basketball player for Partizan Belgrade of the Serbian KLS, the Adriatic League and the EuroLeague.

Youth career
Avramović played in the youth system of Mladost Čačak, before joining city rivals Borac Čačak in 2013.

Professional career

Early years
Avramović had his first senior basketball experience with Borac Čačak where he played the entire 2013–14 season, after which he spent one season playing for OKK Beograd.

In the summer of 2015, he returned to his former team, Borac Čačak. He was league's leading scorer and the MVP in the first half of the season 2015–16. In February game against Mladost Zemun, he scored 47 points on 15 from 21 shooting from the field, while also having 6 assists and 12 rebounds; for such performance, he was named the MVP of the round with the index rating of 63. He finished the season with the averages of 20.1 points, 4.4 rebounds and 5.9 assists per game.

Varese (2016–2019)
On June 16, 2016, he signed a contract with the Italian team Pallacanestro Varese. On October 3, 2016, he made his debut for the team against Dinamo Sassari, scoring 4 points in 15 minutes. In the first round of the 2016–17 Basketball Champions League, he scored 29 points in 25 minutes against ASVEL. In his debut season with the club, Avramović averaged 6.5 points over 25 Italian League games, while shooting 36.4% from the field.

In 2017–18 season, Avramović improved his season statistics, averaging 11.8 points, 3.1 rebounds and 2.3 assists over 30 Italian League games. In 2018–19, he emerged as team leader, appearing in 30 Italian League games and averaging 17.7 points, 3.4 rebounds and 3 assists per game, while shooting 43.8% from the field and 39.5% on 5.2 three-point attempts per game.

Unicaja (2019–2021)
On June 28, 2019, he signed a two-year deal with Unicaja of the Liga ACB, reportedly worth 530,000 euros. He was on loan to Estudiantes and averaged 14.7 points per game before the season was suspended. On June 10, 2020, he re-signed with Estudiantes, In 2020–21 season, he averaged 16.4 points, 3.5 assists and 2.9 rebounds over 36 games of the Spanish League.

Partizan Belgrade (2021–present) 
On July 6, 2021, Avramović signed a two-year deal with KK Partizan of the ABA League and the EuroCup.

References

Sources 
 Aleksa Avramovic | The Serbian's basketball dream came true through a window

External links
 Aleksa Avramović at aba-liga.com
 Aleksa Avramović at acb.com
 Aleksa Avramović at eurobasket.com
 Aleksa Avramović at fiba.com
 Aleksa Avramović at legabasket.it
 

1994 births
Living people
ABA League players
Baloncesto Málaga players
Basketball League of Serbia players
Basketball players from Čačak
CB Estudiantes players
KK Borac Čačak players
KK Partizan players
Lega Basket Serie A players
Liga ACB players
OKK Beograd players
Pallacanestro Varese players
Point guards
Serbian expatriate basketball people in Italy
Serbian expatriate basketball people in Spain
Serbian men's basketball players
Shooting guards